Clement Graham Crowden (30 November 1922 – 19 October 2010) was a Scottish actor. He was best known for his many appearances in television comedy dramas and films, often playing eccentric "offbeat" scientist, teacher and doctor characters.

Early life
Crowden was born on 30 November 1922 in Edinburgh, the son of University of Edinburgh-educated schoolmaster Harry Graham Crowden (d. 1938) and Anne Margaret (née Paterson). He was educated at Clifton Hall School and the Edinburgh Academy before serving briefly in the Royal Scots Youth Battalion of the army until he was injured in an accident. During arms drill he was shot by his platoon sergeant, when the sergeant's rifle discharged. The sergeant reportedly enquired "What is it now, Crowden?", to which Crowden replied "I think you've shot me, sergeant." He later found work in a tannery.

Acting career
Crowden had a long theatrical career, most notably at Laurence Olivier's National Theatre where he performed as The Player King in Rosencrantz and Guildenstern Are Dead, a play by Tom Stoppard.

He occasionally played mad scientists in film, taking the role of Doctor Millar in the Mick Travis films of director Lindsay Anderson, O Lucky Man! (1973) and Britannia Hospital (1982) and also playing the sinister Doctor Smiles in the film of Michael Moorcock's first Jerry Cornelius novel, The Final Programme (1973). He also played the eccentric history master in Anderson's if.... (1968). In 1970, he appeared in the popular Thames Television series Callan as The Groper, a de-registered doctor, who had been in Wormwood Scrubs called on by Callan, when unofficial medical assistance was required (e.g. Series 3, "A Village Called G" and likely others between 1967–73 though some are now lost).

In 1975, he made an appearance in "No Way Out" an episode of the British sitcom Porridge alongside Ronnie Barker, Brian Wilde, Richard Beckinsale and Fulton Mackay, as the prison doctor when Fletcher was complaining of an injured leg.

He was offered the role of the Fourth Doctor in Doctor Who in 1974, when Jon Pertwee left the role, but turned it down, informing producer Barry Letts that he was not prepared to commit himself to the series for three years. Crowden's potential hiring was the reason why Ian Marter was originally hired for a role, as the producers and directors considered Crowden too old to be seen running about and taking on a larger physical role. The role of the Doctor ultimately went to Tom Baker. Crowden subsequently appeared in The Horns of Nimon (1979–80) as a villain opposite Baker.

A regular role was in the BBC comedy-drama A Very Peculiar Practice (1986–88) as the alcoholic Dr Jock McCannon. In 1990, he appeared as a lecherous peer in the BBC comedy Don't Wait Up and in 1991 he played a modest role in the Rumpole of the Bailey episode "Rumpole and the Quacks", playing Sir Hector MacAuliffe, the head of a medical inquest into the potential sexual misconduct on the part of Ghulam Rahmat (played by Saeed Jaffrey).

In 1990, he landed the role of Tom Ballard in the sitcom Waiting for God, opposite Stephanie Cole's character Diana Trent, as the two rebellious retirement home residents. The show ran for five years and was a major success.

In 1994, Crowden played the part of Professor Pollux in the BBC TV adaptation of the John Hadfield novel Love on a Branch Line.

Crowden then voiced the role of Mustrum Ridcully in the 1997 animated Cosgrove Hall production of Terry Pratchett's Soul Music.

In 2001, he guest-starred in the Midsomer Murders episode "Ring Out Your Dead" and also played The Marquis of Auld Reekie in The Way We Live Now. Between 2001 and 2002, he played a role in the BBC Radio 4 comedy series The Leopard in Autumn. In 2003, he made a cameo appearance as a sadistic naval school teacher in The Lost Prince. In 2005–08, he starred in the BBC Radio 4 sci-fi comedy Nebulous as Sir Ronald Rolands. In 2008, he appeared as a guest star in Foyle's War.

For many years towards the end of his life, he lived in Mill Hill, London NW7.

Death
Crowden died on 19 October 2010 in Edinburgh after a short illness. Crowden was survived by his wife, Phyllida Hewat, whom he married in 1952, a son and three daughters, one of whom, Sarah Crowden, followed him into acting.

Filmography

Television roles

Film roles

References

Michael Palin, Halfway to Hollywood, p. 162

External links

 Obituary in The Independent
 

1922 births
2010 deaths
20th-century Scottish male actors
21st-century Scottish male actors
British Army personnel of World War II
Male actors from Edinburgh
People educated at Clifton Hall School
People educated at Edinburgh Academy
Royal Scots soldiers
Scottish male film actors
Scottish male radio actors
Scottish male television actors